World Series of Fighting-Global, also known as WSOF-Global, is an American mixed martial arts (MMA) promotion that was started in 2012 and based in Las Vegas, Nevada. WSOF has divided into two branches after WSOF signed Aggression (run by Darren Ownen) which became WSOF-Canada, 2 of the 8 WSOF owners gained International Branding Rights, WSOF Global. The 6 other owners didn't like it and tried to sue. The 2 WSOF Global owners retained their rights. Owen now works for WSOF Global. The two companies now work amicably separate branches of the same brand. WSOF does not affiliate or own any companies outside of themselves. They focus on US shows. WSOF-Global affiliates with 13 current partner promotions.

This list is an up-to-date roster of those fighters currently under contract with the WSOF-Global.

Heavyweights (265 lb, 120 kg)

Light Heavyweights (205 lb, 93 kg)

Middleweights (185 lb, 84 kg)

Welterweights (170 lb, 77 kg)

Lightweights (155 lb, 70 kg)

Featherweights (145 lb, 65 kg)

Bantamweights (135 lb, 61 kg)

Flyweights (125 lb, 56kg)

Women's Featherweights (145 lb, 65.8 kg; 10.4 st)

Women's Bantamweights (135 lb, 61.2 kg; 9.6 st)

Women's Flyweights (125 lb, 56.7 kg; 8.9 st)

Women's Strawweights (115 lb, 52.2 kg; 8.2 st)

Women's Atomweights (105 lb, 52.2 kg) 

 Unless otherwise cited, all records are retrieved from sherdog.com.

See also
List of WSOF champions
List of WSOF events
List of current Bellator fighters
List of current Invicta FC fighters
List of current ONE fighters
List of current Rizin FF fighters
List of current UFC fighters
List of current WSOF fighters
List of current Road FC fighters

References

External links 
WSOF
WSOF-Global

Lists of mixed martial artists